The 2000 Cracker Barrel Old Country Store 500 was the fourth stock car race of the 2000 NASCAR Winston Cup Series and the 41st iteration of the event. The race was held on Sunday, March 12, 2000, in Hampton, Georgia at Atlanta Motor Speedway, a  permanent D-shaped oval racetrack. The race was contested over 325 laps. At race's end, Dale Earnhardt, driving for Richard Childress Racing, held off Bobby Labonte in a photo finish for his 75th career NASCAR Winston Cup Series win. Earnhardt would beat Labonte by 0.010 of a second. To fill out the podium, Mark Martin of Roush Racing would finish third, respectively.

Background 

Atlanta Motor Speedway (formerly Atlanta International Raceway) is a 1.54-mile race track in Hampton, Georgia, United States, 20 miles (32 km) south of Atlanta. It has annually hosted NASCAR Winston Cup Series stock car races since its inauguration in 1960.

The venue was bought by Speedway Motorsports in 1990. In 1994, 46 condominiums were built over the northeastern side of the track. In 1997, to standardize the track with Speedway Motorsports' other two intermediate ovals, the entire track was almost completely rebuilt. The project made the track one of the fastest on the NASCAR circuit.

Entry list 

 (R) - denotes rookie driver

Practice

First practice 
The first practice session was held on Friday, March 10, at 11:00 AM EST, and would last for one hour and 30 minutes.

Second practice 
The second practice session was held on Friday, March 10, at 1:40 PM EST, and would last for 23 minutes, due to inclement weather.

Final practice 
The final practice session, sometimes referred to as Happy Hour, was held on Saturday, March 11.

Qualifying 
Qualifying was held on Friday, March 3, at 2:00 PM PST. Each driver would have one lap to set a fastest time; and that lap would count as their official qualifying lap. Positions 1-36 would be decided on time, while positions 37-43 would be based on provisionals. Six spots are awarded by the use of provisionals based on owner's points. The seventh is awarded to a past champion who has not otherwise qualified for the race. If no past champ needs the provisional, the next team in the owner points will be awarded a provisional.

Five drivers would fail to qualify: Dave Marcis, Ed Berrier, Johnny Benson Jr., Mike Bliss, and Robby Gordon.

Full qualifying results

Race results

References 

2000 NASCAR Winston Cup Series
March 2000 sports events in the United States
2000 in sports in Nevada
NASCAR races at Atlanta Motor Speedway